The O. T. Bassett Tower is an Art Deco skyscraper located at 303 Texas Avenue in Downtown El Paso, Texas. It was built by Charles N. Bassett, who named it in honor of his father. The tower was designed by Trost & Trost and completed in 1930, making it one of Henry Trost's last commissions. It was briefly the tallest building in the city but was surpassed later the same year by the Hilton Hotel. The Bassett Tower is 217 feet (66 m) tall and has 15 stories, with setbacks at the tenth and thirteenth floors. It is faced with tan brick veneer and adorned with stone and terra cotta decorative elements, including a sculpted face over the main entrance which is believed to be that of Trost himself.

The building was listed in the National Register of Historic Places in 1980.

See also

National Register of Historic Places listings in El Paso County, Texas

References

External links
Official site
Emporis

Streamline Moderne architecture in the United States
Skyscraper office buildings in Texas
Skyscrapers in El Paso, Texas
Trost & Trost buildings
National Register of Historic Places in El Paso County, Texas
Art Deco architecture in Texas
Office buildings completed in 1930
Office buildings on the National Register of Historic Places in Texas